Psalm 89 is the 89th psalm in the biblical Book of Psalms, part of the Hebrew Bible, described as a maschil or "contemplation".

In the slightly different numbering system used in the Greek Septuagint and Latin Vulgate translations of the Bible, this psalm is Psalm 89. It has 52 verses and concludes Book 3 of the Psalms.

Analysis
The superscription of the psalm states that it was written by Ethan the Ezrahite, who, along with Heman the Ezrahite (to whom Psalm 88 is attributed), was a wise man from the time of, or prior to, King Solomon. 1 Kings 4:31 states that Solomon "was wiser than all other men, wiser than Ethan the Ezrahite, and Heman, Calcol, and Darda, the sons of Mahol, and his fame was in all the surrounding nations" (ESV).

In 2 Samuel 7:12–17, God promises King David that there will always be a king of the Jews. Some scholars claim that this psalm was written after the deportation of the Jews to Babylon. However, this claim is inconsistent with the dating of Ethan to the time of Solomon. More likely is that it was written on behalf of the king (David or Solomon) during a time of trouble. The author expresses his belief that the promises outlined in 2 Samuel 7:12-17 will be fulfilled.

Charles Spurgeon called this psalm a Covenant Psalm and described it as "the utterance of a believer". It begins with words of praise for Yahweh's goodness and covenant faithfulness. For the first 37 verses, the psalm recounts the promises made to King David and the covenant established by God with him; from verse 38 to 51, the psalmist laments what seems to him like God's lack of remembrance of his covenant promises.

Verse 52
Blessed be the Lord forevermore!Amen and Amen.This closing verse is the benediction or doxology by which the third book of the psalter is brought to a close, "[not] part of the original psalm, [but] entirely in harmony with the spirit of it".

Uses
Judaism
This psalm is recited during Selichot in some traditions.
Verse 53 is the first verse of Baruch Hashem L'Olam in Pesukei Dezimra and Baruch Hashem L'Olam after the Shema in weekday Maariv.
Verses 16-18 are recited following the Shofar blowing on Rosh Hashanah.

New Testament
Part of verse 10 is quoted in Luke 
Verse 20 is quoted in Acts 

Book of Common Prayer
In the Church of England's Book of Common Prayer, this psalm is appointed to be read in the evening of the 17th day of the month.

 Musical Setings 
Alan Hovhaness set the text to music in his opus 27 choral work O Lord God of Hosts''.

See also
Ethan (biblical figure)

References

External links 

 in Hebrew and English - Mechon-mamre
 King James Bible - Wikisource

089